Anoncia episcia is a moth in the family Cosmopterigidae. It is found in the United States in California and Arizona.

References

Cosmopteriginae
Moths of North America
Fauna of the Colorado Desert
Fauna of the Mojave Desert
Moths described in 1907